Diamond Men is a 2000 film, a crime drama starring Robert Forster and Donnie Wahlberg.

The independent film was written and directed by Dan Cohen, and was screened at the Hamptons International Film Festival in October 2000. It was released to select theatres in the US on September 14, 2001.

Plot
Eddie Miller (Robert Forster) is a traveling salesman, servicing towns in Pennsylvania. He sells diamonds and jewelry to 'Mom & Pop' one of a kind stores. In the business for thirty years, he is weary of the grind after recovering from a heart attack, the recent death of his wife, and the corporate take-over that he senses will eliminate his employment. He is a 'liability', a dinosaur. A last task: train his replacement, Bobby Walker (Donnie Wahlberg). This is a 'road' film, 'buddy' film, and 'coming-of-age' film as the plot unfolds. Eddie eases up on the brash, uncouth Bobby, and they eventually develop a mutual respect; learning from each other. Tina (Jasmine Guy), a Madam with a heart of gold, and Katie (Bess Armstrong) as a reluctant prostitute complete the cast of characters.

Cast
 Robert Forster as Eddie Miller
 Donnie Wahlberg as Bobby Walker
 Bess Armstrong as Katie Harnish
 Jasmine Guy as Tina
 George Coe as 'Tip' Rountree
 Jeff Gendelman as Brad
 Glenn Phillips as Mick
 Paul Price as Carl
 Paul Hewitt as Fess
 Leonard Kelly-Young as Brennan
 Douglas Allen Johnson as John Ludwig
 KaDee Strickland as Monica
 Nikki Fritz as Fran
 Kristin Minter as Cherry
 Shannah Laumeister Stern as Amber
 Katie Rimmer as Priscilla
 Kateri Walker as Melody
 Kathleen Conner as Angel
 Melissa Greenspan as Krystal
 Jana Ferner as Emily
 Bruce Smirnoff as Executive
 James C. Burns as Detective
 Kate Forster as Customer
 Irving Simons as Jeweler

References

External links
Official website

 
 

2000 crime drama films
2000 films
American independent films
American crime drama films
2000 independent films
2000s English-language films
2000s American films